Lenny or Lennie may refer to:

People and fictional characters
 Lenny (given name), a list of people and fictional characters
 Lennie (surname), a list of people
 Lenny (singer) (born 1993), Czech songwriter
 lennie (singer) (born 2021), Croatian singer-songwriter

Arts and entertainment

Music
 Lenny (album), by Lenny Kravitz
 "Lenny" (instrumental), by Stevie Ray Vaughan
 "Lenny" (Buggles song), a 1982 song by The Buggles
 "Lenny" (Supergrass song), a 1995 song by Supergrass
 Lenny, a guitar owned by Stevie Ray Vaughan
 Leonard Bernstein, American conductor, pianist and composer

Other arts and entertainment
 Lenny (bot), an anti-telemarketing chatbot
 Lenny (film), a 1974 biography of Lenny Bruce
 "Lenny" (short story), a 1958 short story by author Isaac Asimov
 Lenny (TV series), a 1990–1991 situation comedy starring Lenny Clarke
 Lenny face (Internet emoticon), used to express sexual innuendo, or mischief

Other uses
 Hurricane Lenny, a 1999 hurricane in the Atlantic Ocean
 Lenny's Sub Shop, a sandwich-shop chain
 "Lennies", stationary lenticular clouds 
 Lenny, the codename of version 5.0 of the Debian Linux operating system

See also
 Lennie (barque), a Canadian-built barque
 Leny (disambiguation)
 
 Leonard (disambiguation)
 Leonardo (disambiguation)
 Lemmy (1945–2015), British musician